Mark Edward Pope (born September 11, 1972) is an American basketball coach and former player who is the nineteenth and current head coach of Brigham Young University's (BYU) men's basketball team. He played college basketball for the Kentucky Wildcats, where he was part of the Wildcats 1996 championship team, and the Washington Huskies, where he was the Pac-10 Freshman of the Year. He later played professionally in the National Basketball Association for the Indiana Pacers, Milwaukee Bucks and Denver Nuggets.

Career
Pope was a high school star at Newport High School in Bellevue, Washington and played two years at the University of Washington (UW). He earned Pac-10 Freshman of the Year honors in 1992 after setting a UW freshman single-season record with 8.1 rebounds per game. He transferred to the University of Kentucky, where he was a captain of the 1996 NCAA Men's Basketball Championship team. Pope was a second round pick of the Indiana Pacers in the 1996 NBA draft. The 2004-05 season was his last, as he was cut in training camp with the Denver Nuggets the following season.

In 2006, Pope enrolled in medical school at Columbia University College of Physicians and Surgeons in New York City. In 2009, he left medical school and joined Mark Fox's coaching staff at the University of Georgia.  Fox was an assistant coach when both were at UW. The following season (2010–11), Pope moved to Wake Forest University to serve as an assistant under Jeff Bzdelik.

In May 2011, Pope was hired as an assistant to Dave Rose at BYU, when Dave Rice left to become the head coach at UNLV.

In March 2015, Pope was hired as the new head basketball coach at Utah Valley University (UVU), replacing the retiring Dick Hunsaker.

In April 2019, Pope was hired to replace Dave Rose as head coach at BYU after Rose retired.

Personal life
Pope and his wife, Lee Anne, a former assistant to talk show host David Letterman, have four daughters. Lee Anne is the daughter of the late Lynn Archibald, who was the head basketball coach at the University of Utah from 1983-1989 and was an assistant at BYU in the 1990s. Pope is a member of the Church of Jesus Christ of Latter-day Saints.

BYU head coach (2019-present) 
On April 10, 2019, Pope was hired as BYU's 19th head men’s basketball coach since its inaugural season in 1902-03. Pope came back to BYU after serving as the head coach at Utah Valley the previous four seasons.

In his first season as BYU's head coach, Pope led the Cougars to a record of 24-8, the most wins for a first-year coach in program history. He became just the second first-year BYU coach to lead his team into the top 25 and the first to end his debut season ranked. The Cougars entered the top 25 as No. 23 in the AP Poll on Feb. 17 and jumped to as high as No. 14. 

In league play, Pope guided the Cougars to a record of 13-3, second in the West Coast Conference (WCC). The 13 wins – which included a 91-78 victory over No. 2 Gonzaga in the Marriott Center – are tied for the most by BYU since joining the WCC in 2011. Gonzaga was the highest-ranked team BYU has defeated in the history of the Marriott Center. The Cougars finished the regular season on a nine-game win streak, the team's longest win streak in WCC play.

BYU boasted one of the most efficient offenses in the nation in 2019-20, evidenced by top 5 national rankings in several statistical categories. The Cougars finished the season ranked No. 1 in 3-point field goal percentage, No. 2 in assist/turnover ratio, No. 3 in field goal percentage, No. 4 in 3-point field goals per game and No. 5 in assists per game. In addition to the national rankings, BYU set program records for 3-point field goals in a single-game, 3-point field goals in a single season and 3-point field goals per game for a season.

In addition to the team success, three players earned All-WCC First Team honors in Yoeli Childs, T.J. Haws, and Jake Toolson. Childs also earned first-team All-District honors from the USBWA and NABC and was a Senior CLASS Award second-team All-American. Haws earned a spot on the CoSIDA Academic All-America Third Team and Toolson was named the WCC Newcomer of the Year.

The team was projected to be a lock for an at-large bid for the NCAA Tournament, which would have been their first berth since 2015. However, the COVID-19 pandemic cancelled the tournament and prematurely ended the successful season. BYU ended the season at No. 18 in the AP Poll and No. 16 in the USA Today Coaches Poll.

Pope gained a reputation for landing transfers in the offseason, including beating out alma mater Kentucky and Texas Tech to get top transfer Matt Haarms from Purdue. He also added Nigerian native Gideon George and UVU guard Brandon Averette, who was a former player of Pope while he was coaching the Wolverines. 

Pope's early success with the Cougars continued in 2020-21, although the team was distinctly different in their styles than the previous season. The 2019-20 team mainly relied on their upperclassmen and three-point shooting. While the 2020-21 team is led by their three seniors Barcello, Averette, and Haarms, the team relies more on physical play due to much more size and has a lot more players off the bench to contribute, adding much depth. The team finished 10-3 in WCC play, highlighted by a big win at No. 18 San Diego State and a sweep of Saint Mary's.

The team reached the finals of the West Coast Conference Tournament, losing to Gonzaga 88-78. The team received an at-large bid for the NCAA Tournament for the first time in six years. They lost their first game to UCLA 73-62.

On January 20, 2022, BYU defeated San Diego 79-71, which marked Pope's 60th career win at BYU and made him the fastest BYU head coach ever to reach that benchmark. The win also gave the Cougars a 16-4 record for the season, which was Pope's best start through 20 games as head coach.

BYU assistant coach 
From 2011 to 2015, Pope served as an assistant under Dave Rose. In four years, Pope helped the Cougars to four-straight 20-win seasons and four-straight postseason appearances—including three bids to the NCAA Tournament and trip to the semifinals of the 2013 NIT.

Other coaching experience 
Prior to coming to BYU as an assistant, Pope was the director of basketball operations for Mark Fox at Georgia (2009-10) and an assistant under Jeff Bzdelik at Wake Forest (2010-11). Following four seasons as a Cougar assistant coach, Pope took over the men's basketball program at UVU. In four years at UVU (2015-19), Pope’s teams made improvements each season, going from 12 wins in 2015-16 to 25 victories in 2018-19. He also led the Wolverines to three-straight postseason appearances (2017, 2018, 2019) and back-to-back 20-win seasons (2017-18, 2018-19)—both are Wolverine records.

Career statistics

NBA

Source

Regular season
 
|-
| style="text-align:left;"|
| style="text-align:left;"|Indiana
| 28 || 0 || 6.9 || .341 || .333 || .588 || .9 || .3 || .1 || .2 || 1.4
|-
| style="text-align:left;"|
| style="text-align:left;"|Indiana
| 4 || 0 || 6.5 || .143 || .000 || .000 || 1.0 || .0 || .0 || .0 || .5
|-
| style="text-align:left;"|
| style="text-align:left;"|Milwaukee
| 63 || 45 || 15.0 || .437 || .208 || .629 || 2.3 || .6 || .3 || .4 || 2.4
|-
| style="text-align:left;"|
| style="text-align:left;"|Milwaukee
| 45 || 12 || 9.5 || .396 || .160 || .524 || 1.6 || .4 || .2 || .2 || 1.9
|-
| style="text-align:left;"|
| style="text-align:left;"|Denver
| 4 || 0 || 5.0 || .500 || – || .000 || .8 || .0 || .1 || .0 || .5
|-
| style="text-align:left;"|
| style="text-align:left;"|Denver
| 9 || 0 || 3.0 || .333 || – || – || .9 || .1 || .1 || .2 || .4
|- class="sortbottom"
| style="text-align:center;" colspan="2"|Career
| 153 || 57 || 10.7 || .401 || .179 || .573 || 1.7 || .4 || .2 || .3 || 1.9

Playoffs
 
|-
| style="text-align:left;"|1998
| style="text-align:left;"|Indiana
| 7 || 0 || 6.0 || .667 || .000 || 1.000 || .7 || .1 || .1 || .0 || 1.3
|-
| style="text-align:left;"|2001
| style="text-align:left;"|Milwaukee
| 6 || 3 || 7.7 || .500 || .000 || – || 2.0 || .3 || .3 || .0 || 1.7
|- class="sortbottom"
| style="text-align:center;" colspan="2"|Career
| 13 || 3 || 6.8 || .563 || .000 || 1.000 || 1.3 || .2 || .2 || .0 || 1.5

Head coaching record

References

External links
 Mark Pope Official BYU Bio

1972 births
Living people
American expatriate basketball people in Turkey
American men's basketball players
Anadolu Efes S.K. players
Basketball coaches from Nebraska
Basketball coaches from Washington (state)
Basketball players from Nebraska
Basketball players from Washington (state)
BYU Cougars men's basketball coaches
Columbia University Vagelos College of Physicians and Surgeons alumni
Denver Nuggets players
Indiana Pacers draft picks
Indiana Pacers players
Kentucky Wildcats men's basketball players
Latter Day Saints from Washington (state)
Milwaukee Bucks players
Power forwards (basketball)
Small forwards
Sportspeople from Omaha, Nebraska
Ülker G.S.K. basketball players
Utah Valley Wolverines men's basketball coaches
Wake Forest Demon Deacons men's basketball coaches
Washington Huskies men's basketball players